"Shadows Fall" is the first single by The Coral released in 2001. The songs were mixed by Mike Hunter. It was limited to 1000 copies and charted at No. 180. "Shadows Fall" and "The Ballad of Simon Diamond" are different  recordings than those featured on The Coral (2002). The song was featured at number 25 in NME's top 50 singles of 2001.

Track listing

Personnel
The Coral
 James Skelly – vocals, guitar, co-producer
 Lee Southall – guitar, co-producer
 Bill Ryder-Jones – guitar, trumpet, co-producer
 Paul Duffy – bass guitar, saxophone, co-producer
 Nick Power – keyboards, co-producer
 Ian Skelly – drums, co-producer, artwork

Production
 Mike Hunter – producer, mixing
 Pat O'Shaunessy – producer (track 3)

Chart performance

References

External links
 
 
 

2001 singles
The Coral songs
2001 songs